Marieke van der Wal (born 1979) is a retired Dutch handball goalkeeper. She plays on the Dutch national team and participated at the 2011 World Women's Handball Championship in Brazil.

References

1979 births
Living people
Dutch female handball players
Sportspeople from Delft
Expatriate handball players
Dutch expatriate sportspeople in Germany
Dutch expatriate sportspeople in Spain
Dutch expatriate sportspeople in France
Lesbian sportswomen
Dutch LGBT sportspeople
LGBT handball players